Pritchard may refer to:

Buildings
Pritchard Gymnasium, a sports complex in Stony Brook, New York, U.S.
Pritchard House, Titusville, Florida, U.S.
Pritchard Hall, a residence hall on the Campus of Virginia Tech, Blacksburg, Virginia, U.S.

Places
Pritchard Peak, Antarctica
Mount Pritchard, New South Wales, Australia
Pritchard, British Columbia, Canada
Pritchard Provincial Park, British Columbia, Canada

Pritchard Park, Bainbridge Island, Washington, U.S.
Bartel-Pritchard Square, Windsor Terrace, Brooklyn, New York

Others
Pritchard (surname)
 Pritchard Power (now Uniflow Power), a small-scale stationary plant

See also
The Amazing Mrs Pritchard, British television programme
Paul Pritchard Shipyard, Mount Pleasant, South Carolina, U.S.
Pritchard Rocket Air Ship, American homebuilt wingless aircraft
Prichard (disambiguation)
R v Pritchard (1836), a law case in England and Wales on assessing a defendant's fitness to plead